Take a Picture may refer to:

 Take a Picture (album), by Margo Guryan
 "Take a Picture" (Carly Rae Jepsen song)
 "Take a Picture" (Filter song)
 "Take a Picture" (NiziU song)